Danuta Urbanik (born 24 December 1989) is a Polish middle-distance runner. She represented her country at the 2014 and 2016 World Indoor Championships.

Competition record

Personal bests
Outdoor
800 metres – 2:00.84 (Szczecin 2011)
1000 metres – 2:38.71 (Brussels 2013)
1500 metres – 4:06.58 (Turku 2016)
3000 metres – 9:09.53 (Stalowa Wola 2015)

Indoor
800 metres – 2:03.36 (Sopot 2014)
1000 metres – 2:41.08 (Spała 2014)
1500 metres – 4:09.41 (Portland 2016)

References

External links
 
 PZLA profile

1989 births
Living people
Polish female middle-distance runners
People from Stalowa Wola
Athletes (track and field) at the 2016 Summer Olympics
Olympic athletes of Poland
Competitors at the 2011 Summer Universiade
Competitors at the 2013 Summer Universiade
20th-century Polish women
21st-century Polish women